Phegans Bay  is a suburb within the local government area of the  on the Central Coast of New South Wales, Australia.

References 

Suburbs of the Central Coast (New South Wales)
Bays of New South Wales